Micklem is a surname. Notable people with the surname include:

Caryl Micklem (1925–2003), English minister in the Congregational and United Reformed churches, hymn writer and religious broadcaster
Gerald Micklem (1911–1988), English golfer and golf administrator
Nathaniel Micklem (politician) (1853–1954), British politician and lawyer
Nathaniel Micklem (theologian) (1888–1976), British theologian and activist
Philip Micklem (1876–1965), English Anglican priest
Robert Micklem (1891–1952), English Royal Navy officer and businessman
Sarah Micklem, American writer